The 1956 Italian local elections were held on 27 and 28 May. The elections were held in 7,141 municipalities and 78 provinces.

Municipal elections
Results summary of the main municipalities.

Provincial elections
Results summary of 78 provinces.

External links

1956 elections in Italy
 
Municipal elections in Italy